Genista stenopetala, the sweet broom, Easter broom or leafy broom (syn. Genista spachiana, Cytisus spachianus), is a species of flowering plant in the legume family Fabaceae, native to the Canary Islands, on La Palma and Tenerife.

The flowers appear in late winter or early spring.

The Latin specific epithet stenopetala means "with narrow petals". 

Under the name Genista × spachiana, it has won the Royal Horticultural Society's Award of Garden Merit. It is not a hardy plant, and does not tolerate temperatures below , so in temperate climates it is usually grown under glass. However, it may be placed outside during the summer months, in a sheltered, sunny spot.

References

Huxley, A., ed. (1992). New RHS Dictionary of Gardening. Macmillan.

stenopetala
Endemic flora of the Canary Islands